Nong'an County is a county of Jilin Province, Northeast China, it is under the administration of the prefecture-level city of Changchun, the capital of Jilin. The westernmost county-level division of Changchun City, it borders Dehui to the east, Kuancheng and Luyuan Districts to the southeast, as well as the prefecture-level cities of Siping to the southwest and Songyuan to the northwest.

Administrative divisions

There are 10 towns and 11 townships under the county's administration.

Towns:
Nong'an
Fulongquan
Halahai
Kaoshan
Kai'an
Shaoguo
Gaojiadian
Huajia
Sanshengyu
Bajilei

Townships:
Qiangang Township
Longwang Township
Sangang Township
Wanshun Township
Yangshulin Township
Yong'an Township
Qingshankou Township
Huangyuquan Township
Xinnong Township
Wanjinta Township
Xiaochengzi Township

Climate

References

External links
Official website of Nong'an County Government

County-level divisions of Jilin
Changchun